Iain Gale is a journalist and author born in 1959, who writes military novels.  His book Four Days in June, about the Battle of Waterloo, was well received and acclaimed by Bernard Cornwell. He is also the writer of eleven non-fiction books.

Biography and career 
Iain Gale was born in 1959 in central London, to Scottish parents. His father was the political cartoonist, George Gale. He grew up in Ham, near Richmond, London, and was educated at St Paul's School, London, and the University of Edinburgh. He was deputy art critic of The Independent from 1990 to 1996, and art critic for Scotland on Sunday for 12 years from 1996 to 2008. He is currently the editor of the National Trust for Scotland magazine. He is married to an Edinburgh GP: between them they have six children. They divide their time between Edinburgh and Fife.

Works
Following a series of non-fiction books, Gale published his first novel, the well received Four Days in June, about the Battle of Waterloo, in 2006. He followed this with a series of three books featuring the character Jack Steel, set during the campaigns of the Duke of Marlborough. In 2009 he published Alamein, about the Second Battle of El Alamein, which like Four Days in June was based largely on the experiences of real-life participants. More recently he has published two novels in a projected Second World War series featuring the character Peter Lamb and his men; and another four in a Napoleonic Wars series featuring a band of roguish scouting officers led by Captain James Keane.

Bibliography

Non-fiction
 
 
 
   Italian translation: 
 
 
  (on Jean-Baptiste-Camille Corot)

Fiction

Series
Jack Steel
 
 
 

Peter Lamb
 
 

Keane

References 

Living people
Writers from London
People from Ham, London
People educated at St Paul's School, London
Alumni of the University of Edinburgh
English art critics
English historical novelists
Writers of historical fiction set in the modern age
1959 births